Greenfuel may refer to:

 GreenFuel Technologies Corporation
 Biofuel, or green fuel